Enrique "Quique" Llena León (born 6 November 1961) is a Spanish retired football manager and player. He played as a goalkeeper.

Career
Born in Barbastro, Huesca, Aragón, Llena played youth football for CD Boscos Salesianos. He never left his native region as a senior, representing UD Benabarre, CD Estadilla (where he helped the side to achieve two consecutive promotions, the latter one to Tercera División), Aínsa CD, CD Zaidín and CDJ Tamarite, among other clubs.

After retiring, Llena started working as a manager, with his first side being UD Alcampell. Still in his native Aragon, he worked with the Cadete squad of CD Binéfar, Estadilla and UD Binaced before being appointed in charge of Atlético Monzón in the fourth division.

Llena was also manager of SD Huesca during the 1998–99 campaign, with the club also in division four. In January 2010, he was appointed to be the manager of the Nicaragua national football team.

Llena was sacked from the national team on 8 November 2014, after failing to qualify for the 2015 CONCACAF Gold Cup.

References

External links

1961 births
Living people
Spanish footballers
Footballers from Aragon
Association football goalkeepers
Tercera División players
Spanish football managers
Tercera División managers
Atlético Monzón managers
SD Huesca managers
Nicaragua national football team managers
Spanish expatriate football managers
Expatriate football managers in Nicaragua